Papilio warscewiczii is a Neotropical species of swallowtail butterfly from the genus Papilio that is found in Peru, Bolivia and Ecuador.

Habitat

Montane forest in the Bolivian Yungas ecoregion. The larval food plant is not recorded .

Subspecies
Papilio warscewiczii warscewiczii (south-eastern Peru, Bolivia)
Papilio warscewiczii mercedes Rothschild & Jordan, 1906 (eastern Peru)
Papilio warscewiczii jelskii Oberthür, 1881 (south-eastern Ecuador, north-western Peru)

Taxonomy
Papilio warscewiczii is a member of the homerus species group. The members of this clade are
Papilio cacicus Lucas, 1852
Papilio euterpinus Salvin & Godman, 1868
Papilio garamas (Geyer, [1829])
Papilio homerus Fabricius, 1793
Papilio menatius (Hübner, [1819])
Papilio warscewiczii Hopffer, 1865
and the enigmatic Papilio judicael known only from a handful of specimens and either a valid species from the Andean region, or a hybrid P. menatius × P. warscewiczii.

Papilio warscewiczii is in the subgenus Pterourus Scopoli, 1777 which also includes the species groups: troilus species group, glaucus species group, the zagreus species group and the scamander species group.

Etymology
Named for the collector Józef Warszewicz

References

Lewis, H. L., 1974 Butterflies of the World  Page 25, figure 15 (underside).

External links
Butterflies of America images of types
Global Butterfly Information System Images of syntype in Museum für Naturkunde, Berlin.

Butterflies and Moths of North America

warscewiczii
Papilionidae of South America
Fauna of the Andes
Butterflies described in 1865
Taxa named by Carl Heinrich Hopffer